Beatrice Bartelloni (born 5 February 1993) is an Italian former professional racing cyclist, who rode professionally between 2013 and 2017.

Major results
Sources:

2009
 3rd Time trial, National Novices Road Championships
2011
 UEC European Junior Track Championships
1st  Team pursuit (with Maria Giulia Confalonieri & Chiara Vannucci)
3rd  Individual pursuit
 2nd Junior Chrono Memorial Davide Fardelli
 3rd  Team pursuit, UCI Junior Track World Championships
 8th Road race, UCI Junior Road World Championships
2012
 1st Team pursuit, 2012–13 UCI Track Cycling World Cup, Cali (with Maria Giulia Confalonieri & Giulia Donato)
2013
 National Track Championships
1st  Team pursuit (with Elena Cecchini, Tatiana Guderzo & Marta Tagliaferro)
3rd Team sprint
 1st Scratch, Copa Internacional de Pista
 2nd Omnium, UIV Under-23 Talents Cup Final
 3rd  Team pursuit, UEC European Under-23 Track Championships (with Elena Cecchini, Maria Giulia Confalonieri and Chiara Vannucci)
 3rd Scratch, 3 Jours d'Aigle
2014
 2nd Diamond Tour
 3rd  Team pursuit, UEC European Track Championships (with Elena Cecchini, Simona Frapporti, Tatiana Guderzo and Silvia Valsecchi)
 3rd  Team pursuit, UEC European Under-23 Track Championships (with Elena Cecchini, Maria Giulia Confalonieri and Francesca Pattaro)
2015
 1st  Young rider classification Ladies Tour of Qatar
 3rd Individual pursuit, 3 Jours d'Aigle

References

External links

Living people
Italian female cyclists
1993 births
Olympic cyclists of Italy
Cyclists at the 2016 Summer Olympics
Cyclists of Fiamme Oro
Sportspeople from Trieste
Cyclists from Friuli Venezia Giulia